Automavision is a cinematic technique invented by Danish director Lars von Trier.

Developed with the intention of limiting human influence, in Automavision no cinematographer is actively operating the camera. The best possible fixed camera position is chosen and then a computer chooses framing by randomly tilting, panning or zooming the camera. In doing so it is not uncommon that the actors appear in the shots with a part of their face and head cut from the frame. With this technique then the blame for any "errors" are entirely attributable to a computer.

Von Trier described Automavision as "a principle for shooting film developed with the intention of limiting human influence by inviting chance in from the cold (...) and thus giving the work an idea-less surface free of the force of habit and aesthetics." The principle was used during filming of the movie The Boss of It All (2006). Interviewed by The Guardian in 2006, von Trier said, "For a long time, my films have been handheld. That has to do with the fact that I am a control freak. With Automavision, the technique was that I would frame the picture first and then push a button on the computer. I was not in control — the computer was in control." And in a 2008 interview with The Daily Telegraph, von Trier said "If you want bad framing, Automavision is the perfect way to do it. It was rather pleasant to lose control. In this case, I wanted to lose control 100 per cent."

References

External links
 
 

Cinematic techniques
Cinematography
Photographic techniques
Television terminology
Lars von Trier